The 1922 Loyola Wolf Pack football team was an American football team that represented Loyola College of New Orleans (now known as Loyola University New Orleans) as an independent during the 1922 college football season. In its second season under head coach William Flynn, the team compiled a 4–3–1 record and outscored opponents by a total of 130 to 111.

Schedule

References

Loyola
Loyola Wolf Pack football seasons
Loyola Wolf Pack football